Gordon John Van Wylen (February 6, 1920 – November 5, 2020) was an American engineer, educator, and college administrator, known for his textbooks on thermodynamics and his service as president of Hope College from 1972 to 1987.

Biography
Van Wylen was born in Grant, Michigan. He served in the United States Navy during World War II. 

He received a bachelor's degree from Calvin College, a master's degree from University of Michigan, and a doctorate degree from Massachusetts Institute of Technology. 

In 1959, he published a textbook Thermodynamics, in which he stated a belief in "a Creator" in his summation of the second law of thermodynamics. “A final point to be made is that the second law of thermodynamics and the principle of increase in entropy have great philosophical implications. The question that arises is how did the universe get into the state of reduced entropy in the first place, since all natural processes known to us tend to increase entropy? ... The author has found that the second law tends to increase his conviction that there is a Creator who has the answer for the future destiny of man and the universe.”

He was chair of the Engineering Department at the University of Michigan from 1969 to 1972. He was appointed president of Hope College in Holland, Michigan, in 1972, serving until his retirement in 1987. He died of complications from COVID-19 in Holland on November 5, 2020, at the age of 100, during the COVID-19 pandemic in Michigan.

Bibliography

Notes

References 

1920 births
2020 deaths
21st-century American physicists
American centenarians
Men centenarians
People from Newaygo County, Michigan
Calvin University alumni
Massachusetts Institute of Technology alumni
University of Michigan alumni
University of Michigan faculty
Deaths from the COVID-19 pandemic in Michigan
Military personnel from Michigan
United States Navy personnel of World War II
United States Navy officers
Writers from Michigan